Tone Pavček (29 September 1928 – 21 October 2011) was one of the most influential Slovene poets, translators, and essayists from the first post-war generation. He published numerous collections of poetry, well received by readers and critics alike. He also translated a number of Russian works into Slovene.

Biography

Early life
Tone Pavček was born on 29 September 1928 at Šentjurij in southeastern Slovenia. He attended the first grade of elementary school in Mirna Peč, but was soon sent to a boarding school in Ljubljana. There he graduated from a classical high school, and went on to study law, receiving a bachelor's degree in 1954, although he never performed legal services.

Professional career
In 1958 he worked as a journalist and later a programme director at RTV Slovenia, a position he held until 1972.
 
From 1972 to his retirement in 1990, he was editor-in-chief of the  press, a major publisher at the time in Slovenia.

For a period of four years, starting in 1963, he was also an art director for the Slovenian Youth Theatre in Ljubljana. He presided over the Slovenian Writers Association from 1979 to 1983.

Political engagement
From 1986 to 1990, Pavček was a member of the National Assembly. He was also a member of a working group of the Slovenian Writers Association and Slovenian Sociological Association that created the basis for the first Slovenian constitution, today referred to as ”The Writers' Constitution.” It was published in 1988 in the Journal for Critique of Science, for Imagination and New Anthropology. Pavček took part in a public rally on Congress Square on 8 May 1989, where he read the May Declaration, the first public document demanding Slovenia's independence from Yugoslavia.

Late life
In 1990 Pavček retired and retreated from public life. He remained a frequent guest at literary and cultural events, visiting libraries, schools, and other public institutions. In 1996 he became a UNICEF Goodwill Ambassador, and in 2001 a member of the Slovenian Academy of Sciences and Arts. He was awarded the Golden Order for Merits of the Republic of Slovenia in 2009.

Tone Pavček died on 21 October 2011, at the age of 83 in Ljubljana. He was buried with military honors in Žale cemetery.

Writing
Throughout his life, he was devoted to literature as poet, author of children's books and translator. His poetry for children gained a wide audience due to its original fairy-tale motifs, integrating fantasy and folk elements. Especially important are his translations of Russian literature.

As a highly prolific writer, Pavček's work was recognized by a number of institutions. For the contribution to children's literature he was a three-time recipient of the Levstik Award (1958, 1961, 2005), and two-time nominee for the Hans Christian Andersen Award (2010, 2012). For the book  he received the Veronika Award (2007). His translations were recognized with the Sovre Award in 1979.

For adults
Pavček published his first poem, "" (A Sonnet to Ivan Cankar) at the age of 18 in the contemporary youth literary magazine . His first collection of poems,  (Poems of the Four), co-authored by Kajetan Kovič, Ciril Zlobec, and Janez Menart, was published in 1953. It marks a significant shift to intimism in the Slovene poetry tradition of the 20th century.

Touched by tragic death of his son, he discusses the questions of life and death, identifying an individual as well as community in the process.

The collection of poems  (Angels, 2012), which he finished on his deathbed and was published posthumously, received a great public and critical acclaim, making it the best selling book in Slovenia in 2012.

For children
In his numerous fairy tales, picture books, and verses, Pavček's children's poetry is extremely popular with younger readers. Through words and rhythm, sparkling with wit and optimism, he is able to communicate to his readers on a personal level, inviting them to relive their own experiences.

Translations
Pavček is notable for translations of his contemporaries, especially the Russian poets Sergei Yesenin, Vladimir Mayakovsky, Anna Akhmatova, Boris Pasternak, Marina Tsvetaeva, and Nikolay Zabolotsky.

References

1928 births
2011 deaths
University of Ljubljana alumni
Slovenian poets
Slovenian male poets
Slovenian translators
Russian–Slovene translators
Members of the Slovenian Academy of Sciences and Arts
Slovenian essayists
Prešeren Award laureates
Presidents of the Slovene Writers' Association
Veronika Award laureates
Levstik Award laureates
20th-century poets
20th-century translators
People from the Municipality of Mirna Peč
20th-century essayists